Athabasca-Lac La Biche was a provincial electoral district in Alberta, Canada, mandated to return a single member to the Legislative Assembly of Alberta using the first-past-the-post method of voting from 1986 to 1993.

History
The Athabasca-Lac La Biche electoral district was established in the 1986 electoral boundary re-distribution from the Athabasca and Lac La Biche-McMurray electoral districts.

The electoral district was abolished in the 1993 electoral district re-distribution and succeeded by Lac La Biche-St. Paul and Athabasca-Wabasca electoral districts.

Representation history

The short-lived Athabasca-Lac La Biche electoral district was contested only twice but returned two different members to the Legislature. Although the Progressive Conservatives had held the antecedent ridings since 1971 and 1975, New Democrat Leo Piquette picked up the new riding in 1986, one of only two rural districts won by the party in that election. In 1987 Piquette famously attempted to ask a question in the Legislature in French, sparking controversy over the place of the French language in Alberta.

In 1989, Piquette was defeated by PC candidate Mike Cardinal. He sponsored the Metis Settlements Land Protection Act in 1990 and was appointed to Ralph Klein's cabinet in 1992.

When the riding was abolished in 1993, Cardinal went on to run in the new district of Athabasca-Wabasca, and would serve four more terms in the Legislature. The other part of Athabasca-Lac La Biche went to the new riding of Lac La Biche-St. Paul, which the Liberals would win in the 1993 election.

Election results

1986 general election

1989 general election

See also
List of Alberta provincial electoral districts

References

Further reading

External links 
Elections Alberta
The Legislative Assembly of Alberta

Former provincial electoral districts of Alberta